is a railway station in the town of Kagamiishi, Fukushima Prefecture, Japan operated by East Japan Railway Company (JR East).

Lines
Kagamiishi Station is served by the Tōhoku Main Line, and is located 208.8 rail kilometers from the official starting point of the line at Tokyo Station.

Station layout
The station has one island platform. The station is staffed.

Platforms

History
Kagamiishi Station opened on June 25, 1911. The station was absorbed into the JR East network upon the privatization of the Japanese National Railways (JNR) on April 1, 1987.

Passenger statistics
In fiscal 2018, the station was used by an average of 874 passengers daily (boarding passengers only).

Surrounding area
Kagamiishi Town Hall

Kagamiishi Post Office
Kagamiishi Industrial Park

See also
 List of Railway Stations in Japan

References

External links

  

Stations of East Japan Railway Company
Railway stations in Fukushima Prefecture
Tōhoku Main Line
Railway stations in Japan opened in 1911
Kagamiishi, Fukushima